12 Bit Blues is a studio album by Canadian DJ Kid Koala. It was released on the Ninja Tune label on September 17, 2012. It peaked at number 21 on Billboards Top Dance/Electronic Albums chart, as well as number 6 on the Blues Albums chart.

Recording
The album was recorded on an E-mu SP-1200, a 1987 drum machine and sampler known for its use in early hip hop. On the album, Kid Koala used it to manipulate old blues recordings. In making the album, Kid Koala did not use sequencing software, choosing instead to layer tracks of scratching and cutting on top of the manipulated blues samples.

Critical reception

At Metacritic, which assigns a weighted average score out of 100 to reviews from mainstream critics, 12 Bit Blues received an average score of 80% based on 9 reviews, indicating "generally favorable reviews".

PopMatters named it the 6th best Canadian album of 2012.

Track listing

Charts

References

External links
 

2012 albums
Kid Koala albums
Ninja Tune albums